Ostrya virginiana, the American hophornbeam, is a species of Ostrya native to eastern North America, from Nova Scotia west to southern Manitoba and eastern Wyoming, southeast to northern Florida and southwest to eastern Texas. Populations from Mexico and Central America are also regarded as the same species, although some authors prefer to separate them as a distinct species, Ostrya guatemalensis. Other names include eastern hophornbeam, hardhack (in New England), ironwood, and leverwood.

Description
The bark is brown to gray-brown, with narrow shaggy plates flaking off, while younger twigs and branches are smoother and gray, with small lenticels. Very young twigs are sparsely fuzzy to thickly hairy; the hairs (trichomes) drop off by the next year.

The upper surface is mostly hairless, while the lower surface is sparsely to moderately fuzzy (rarely densely hairy).

The flowers are catkins (spikes) produced in early spring at the same time as the new leaves appear.

The involucre changes from greenish-white to dull brown as the fruit matures.

American hophornbeam is similar to its close relative American hornbeam (Carpinus caroliniana), which can be distinguished by its smooth bark and nutlets enclosed in open, three-lobed bracts.

Subdivisions
There are two subspecies:
 Ostrya virginiana subsp. guatemalensis (H.J.P.Winkl.) A.E.Murray – central and southern Mexico, Guatemala, Honduras, El Salvador
 Ostrya virginiana subsp. virginiana – eastern half of United States, eastern Canada

Populations along the Atlantic coast have slightly smaller leaves, and are sometimes separated as O. virginiana var. lasia Fernald.

Habitat and ecology
In temperate areas of the US and Canada, Ostrya virginiana is found in lowland and foothill forests, where it is predominantly an understory tree.

In Mexico and Central America, Ostrya virginiana is found in cloud forests and humid portions of mid-elevation oak, pine–oak, and pine forests between 1200 and 2800 meters elevation.

The buds and catkins are important source of winter food for some birds, notably ruffed grouse (Bonasa umbellus). Additionally, the nutlets and buds are eaten by birds, deer, and rabbits.

Uses
It is grown as an ornamental plant and is sometimes used as a street tree.

Its wood is very resilient and is valued for making tool handles and fence posts.

Being a diffuse porous hardwood and having extremely high density and resistance to compression, it is an excellent material for the construction of wooden longbows.

References

External links

 Bioimages: Ostrya virginiana.
  University of Wisconsin – Green Bay. Trees of Wisconsin. Ostrya virginiana. 
  Virginia Tech Dendrology. Ostrya virginiana Fact Sheet.
 University of Connecticut. Plants Database. Ostrya virginiana.
 Trees, Shrubs, and Woody Vines of North Carolina. Hophornbeam (Ostrya virginiana).
  Yale University. Cyber Flora. Ostrya virginiana.

virginiana
Hardwood forest plants
Trees of Eastern Canada
Trees of the Eastern United States
Flora of the Appalachian Mountains
Trees of the Northeastern United States
Trees of the Southeastern United States
Trees of Central America
Trees of Mexico
Trees of humid continental climate
Plants described in 1768
Trees of the North-Central United States
Trees of the South-Central United States
Trees of Western Canada
Trees of North America
Trees of Southern Mexico
Trees of the United States
Trees of Canada
Trees of the Great Lakes region (North America)
Trees of the Southern United States
Flora of the Sierra Madre Occidental
Flora of the Sierra Madre Oriental
Cloud forest flora of Mexico